Sunchales Aeroclub Airport  is an airport serving the town of Sunchales in the Santa Fe Province of Argentina.

Airlines and destinations
No scheduled flights operate at this airport.

See also

Transport in Argentina
List of airports in Argentina

References

External links
OurAirports - Sunchales Aeroclub Airport

Airports in Argentina